Edoardo Liberati (born 18 December 1992) is an Italian professional racing driver.

Career

Karting
Liberati began karting in 2006 in the Italian 100 Junior Championship, finishing as runner–up in the series the following year. In the same year he also finished second in the Lazio Regional Championship.

Formula Azzurra
Liberati began his single-seater career in 2008 by participating in the Formula Azzurra series in his native Italy. During the season he took victories at Magione and Misano along with five further podiums to win the title by 12 points from Greek driver Stefanos Kamitsakis.

Italian Formula Three
The following season, Liberati moved up to the Italian Formula Three Championship, joining the BVM–Target Racing team alongside Formula Renault graduate Daniel Zampieri. He contested the first four rounds of the season before moving to rival outfit Lucidi Motors to replace fellow Italian Marco Zipoli, who in turn took Liberati's seat at BVM–Target. He finished in the points on five occasions to be classified 13th in the standings. He also finished fourth in the rookie classification.

Liberati continued in the series in 2010, switching teams to join Andrea Caldarelli and Samuele Buttarelli at the Prema Junior squad. He finished 9th in the standings after securing two podium places at Vallelunga and Monza. He finished level on points with the EuroInternational entry of Gabriel Chaves, but was classified ahead of him on countback.

Liberati will continue in the series for a third season in 2011, joining Team Ghinzani.

Racing record

Career summary

References

External links
 Official website 
 

1992 births
Living people
Racing drivers from Rome
Italian racing drivers
Italian Formula Three Championship drivers
Formula Azzurra drivers
Blancpain Endurance Series drivers
24 Hours of Spa drivers
International GT Open drivers
24H Series drivers
Prema Powerteam drivers
BVM Target drivers
Nismo drivers
KCMG drivers
Euronova Racing drivers
Nürburgring 24 Hours drivers
Lamborghini Super Trofeo drivers